Lehn is a surname. Notable people with this surname include:

 Abraham Lehn (landowner) (1702–1757), Danish landowner
 Christian vom Lehn (born 1992), German swimmer
 Erwin Lehn (1919–2010), German jazz musician
 Jean-Marie Lehn (born 1939), French chemist
 Poul Abraham Lehn, Danish nobleman
 Thomas Lehn (born 1958), German musician
 Unni Lehn (born 1977), Norwegian football midfielder